Charles Sinclair Jr. is a Jamaican politician from the Labour Party. He is a member of the Senate of Jamaica and is Deputy President of the Senate.

In addition, he is the councillor for the Montego Bay North East Division. Senator/Councillor Charles Sinclair is a former Mayor of Montego Bay.

References 

Living people
21st-century Jamaican politicians
Members of the Senate of Jamaica
Jamaica Labour Party politicians
Harvard University alumni
Government ministers of Jamaica
Year of birth missing (living people)